Dairsie, or Osnaburgh, is a village and parish in north-east Fife, Scotland. The village grew out of two smaller settlements (called Dairsiemuir and Osnaburgh), and developed principally around the industry of weaving. Since the late twentieth century it has become a dormitory settlement for nearby towns.

The village may have derived its name of Osnaburgh from weaving osnaburg, a coarse linen or cotton, originally imported from Osnabrück in Germany.

The civil parish has a population of 387 (in 2011).

Historic buildings
Nearby Dairsie Castle (now restored) dates from the early seventeenth century, and was briefly the residence of John Spottiswoode (1565-1639), Archbishop of St Andrews. King James VI stayed at Dairsie Castle following his escape from the Raid of Ruthven in June 1583.

St Mary's Church was built by Archbishop Spottiswoode in 1621. The church is some distance from the village and ceased to be used for worship in 1966. It is now in private hands, and the parish worshippers use the former St Leonard's Church in the village. The congregation is united with St John's Church in Cupar. 
Local businesses include a small Village Shop and Post Office, a Petrol Station and Garage (also selling second hand vehicles) and The Dairise Inn currently trading as Rumbledethumps Restaurant. 
It has a small locals bar, a conservatory restaurant and a small function room / additional restaurant.

History
In 2014 a hoard of Roman hacksilver was found in a field at Dairsie. It is thought that the hacksilver was used by Roman soldiers to pay off the local Pictish tribes when they travelled through the area.

Notable People

Rev Patrick Scougal (later Bishop of Aberdeen) was parish minister 1636 to 1645

References

External links
Entry at Fife Place-name Data

Villages in Fife
Parishes in Fife